The 1991 Hong Kong District Board elections were held on 3 March 1991. Elections were held in all 19 districts of Hong Kong for 274 members from directly elected constituencies, which counted for about two-thirds of the seats in the District Boards.

It was the first of the three-tier elections in 1991, followed by the May Urban and Regional Council elections and the September Legislative Council election in which direct elections would be introduced for the first time. In preparation for these elections, both the liberal pro-democracy and conservative pro-business forces formed political parties to the contest in the coming elections. The pro-democracy party United Democrats of Hong Kong (UDHK) formed as a grand alliance for the pro-democrats in April 1990, the more middle-class oriented Hong Kong Democratic Foundation (HKDF) formed in October 1989 and the pro-business conservative Liberal Democratic Federation of Hong Kong (LDF) formed in November 1990.

About 420,000 voters cast their votes, which counted for 32.5 per cent of the total electorate, higher than the 30.3 per cent of the previous 1988 elections but lower than the 38.9 per cent in the first District Board elections in 1982. 81 incumbents were elected without contest. 70 pre cent of the candidates were affiliated with political groups and public organisations. The newly established liberal United Democrats emerged as the biggest winner in the election, winning 56 seats out of 80 candidates which won evenly in each region. The conservative Liberal Democratic Federation claimed to have won 50 seats out of 89 candidates, although many of them ran as independents of whom only 35 openly acknowledged their LDF affiliation. Three of the seven candidates from the Democratic Foundation got elected, while the other pro-democracy groups, the Meeting Point won 11 out of 13 bids and the Association for Democracy and People's Livelihood (ADPL) got 14 out of 17 candidates elected.

Out of 30 pro-Beijing candidates who contested in the election, 24 of whom were elected, including each five candidates in Eastern District and Kwun Tong, eight candidates and eight other Beijing-friendly candidates in Kowloon Central. The pro-Beijing Hong Kong Federation of Trade Unions also fielded 16 candidates, of whom 12 were elected, despite most of them ran under their local affiliations and only three of them ran openly with FTU endorsement. The satisfying results encouraged the pro-China camp to field their own candidates in the coming Urban Council and Legislative Council elections.

After the elections, Governor David Wilson appointed 140 members to the District Boards.

Results

General outcome

|-
! style="background-color:#E9E9E9;text-align:center;" colspan=2 |Political Affiliation
! style="background-color:#E9E9E9;text-align:right;" |Popular vote
! style="background-color:#E9E9E9;text-align:right;" |%
! style="background-color:#E9E9E9;text-align:right;" |Standing
! style="background-color:#E9E9E9;text-align:right;" |Elected
|-
| width=1px style="background-color: " |
| style="text-align:left;" |United Democrats of Hong Kong 
| 109,747 || 20.64 || 75 || 52
|-
| width=1px style="background-color: " |
| style="text-align:left;" |Liberal Democratic Federation of Hong Kong 
| 47,633 || 8.96 || 51 || 24
|-
| width=1px style="background-color: " |
| style="text-align:left;" |Hong Kong Association for Democracy and People's Livelihood 
| 27,979  || 5.26 || 19	|| 15
|-
| width=1px style="background-color: " |
| style="text-align:left;" |Hong Kong Civic Association 
| 24,760  || 4.66 || 21 || 11
|-
| width=1px style="background-color: " |
| style="text-align:left;" |Meeting Point 
| 18,386 || 3.46 || 13 || 11
|-
|style="background-color:#6495ED"|
| style="text-align:left;" | Tsing Yi Concern Group
| 8,360	|| 1.57 || 4 || 4
|-
|style="background-color:"|
| style="text-align:left;" |Hong Kong Federation of Trade Unions 
| 6,229 || 1.17 || 4 || 4
|-
|style="background-color:"|
| style="text-align:left;" |Tuen Mun Forth Reviewers
| 9,161 || 1.72 || 4 || 3
|-
|style="background-color:"|
| style="text-align:left;" |Hong Kong Democratic Foundation
| 8,667 || 1.63 || 7 || 3
|-
| width=1px style="background-color: " |
| style="text-align:left;" |Neighbourhood and Worker's Service Centre 
| 5,978 || 1.12 || 2 || 2
|-
|style="background-color:#9E5238"|
| style="text-align:left;" |Kwun Tong Man Chung Friendship Promotion Association
| 2,231 || 0.42 || 2 || 2
|-
|style="background-color:#CC0000"|
| style="text-align:left;" |October Review
| 2,382 || 0.45 || 1 || 1
|-
| width=1px style="background-color: " |
| style="text-align:left;" |Reform Club of Hong Kong
| 2,136 || 0.40 || 1 || 1
|-
| width=1px style="background-color: " |
| style="text-align:left;" |Hong Kong and Kowloon Trades Union Council 
| 1,982 || 0.37 || 1 || 1
|-
| width=1px style="background-color: " |
| style="text-align:left;" |Hong Kong Citizen Forum 
| 1,276 || 0.24 || 3 || 1
|-
|style="background-color:"|
| style="text-align:left;" |Independent and others 
| 256,081 || 48.16 || 261 || 137
|-
|style="text-align:left;background-color:#E9E9E9" colspan="2"|Total (turnout 32.47%)
|width="75" style="text-align:right;background-color:#E9E9E9"|531,712
|width="30" style="text-align:right;background-color:#E9E9E9"|100.0
|style="text-align:right;background-color:#E9E9E9"|467
|style="text-align:right;background-color:#E9E9E9"|272
|}

Note: Some of the candidates with multiple affiliations are overlapped in this chart.

Vote summary

Seat summary

References

 
Hong Kong
Local elections
1991
Hong Kong local elections
Hong Kong local elections